El Día Menos Pensado (Spanish for The Least Expected Day) is a Chilean television program broadcast on the screens of Televisión Nacional de Chile, directed by journalist Carlos Pinto, under the Chilean producer Geoimagen. Recreate with actors, stories based on real life, that do not have a scientific explanation and are attributed to paranormal events, two-dimensional encounters and life after death. The main music of the program was composed by Sergio Ruiz de Gamboa. The first season was broadcast in 1999 and the last during 2011. The series was broadcast again in 2020, on Fridays at 1:30 pm and Saturdays at 1 pm (Chilean time).

Cast 
The cast of the series was very varied in its nearly 12 years of broadcast, with the following actors appearing in at least 3 episodes.

 Loreto Moya
 Pedro Vicuña

References 

1990s Chilean supernatural horror television series
2000s Chilean supernatural horror television series
2010s Chilean supernatural horror television series
1990s Chilean mystery television series
2000s Chilean mystery television series
2010s Chilean mystery television series
1999 Chilean television series debuts
1990s Chilean television series
2000s Chilean television series
2010s Chilean television series
Televisión Nacional de Chile original programming
Crime thriller television series
Spanish-language television shows
Televisión Nacional de Chile telenovelas